Olesya Truntaeva is a retired Russian football defender last played for ShVSM Izmailovo in the Russian Championship. She has won four leagues with Lada Togliatti and Zvezda Perm.
 
She started her career in 1998 in second-tier FK Vologzhanka. She debuted in the premier league in 2000 after attaining promotion with Don-Tex Shakhty. In 2004, she signed for Lada Togliatti, where she spent two years. There she won her first national championship and made her debut in the UEFA Women's Cup.

After playing for Nadezhda Noginsk in 2006 she moved to Zvezda Perm, where she took part in the club's most successful period to date with three consecutive championships and an UEFA Women's Cup final. After five seasons in Zvezda, she left it for Mordovochaka Saransk in 2012. In 2013, she signed for ShVSM Izmailovo.

References

1980 births
Living people
Russian women's footballers
FC Energy Voronezh players
FC Lada Togliatti (women) players
Nadezhda Noginsk players
Zvezda 2005 Perm players
CSP Izmailovo players
Women's association football defenders
Sportspeople from Lipetsk